William Kevin Acton (born July 16, 1987) is an American-born Canadian former professional ice hockey player who played with the Edmonton Oilers in the National Hockey League (NHL).

Playing career
Acton attended Lake Superior State University where he played four seasons of NCAA hockey with Lakers where he scored 77 points and registered 132 penalty minutes in 144 games played.

In March 2011, the Toronto Marlies of the American Hockey League (AHL) signed Acton to an amateur tryout contract to begin his professional career.

On July 5, 2013, the Edmonton Oilers signed Acton as a free agent to two-year, two-way contract.

Acton started the 2013–14 season on the Oilers' NHL roster, and scored his first NHL goal on October 14, 2013, against Braden Holtby of the Washington Capitals. He would split the season between the Oilers, and AHL affiliate the Oklahoma City Barons.

In the 2014–15 season, Acton appeared in 3 games with the Oilers before on November 20, 2014, he was traded to the Vancouver Canucks, in exchange for center Kellan Lain. Acton was immediately assigned to the Canucks AHL affiliate, the Utica Comets for the remainder of the season.

As an un-signed free agent over the summer on September 28, 2015, Acton accepted a European offer in agreeing to a one-year deal with German club, Schwenninger Wild Wings of the Deutsche Eishockey Liga (DEL). Acton led the Wild Wings in total points with 55 (16 goals, 39 assists) in 46 games, which ranked him third in the DEL regular season.

After captaining the Wild Wings in the 2017–18 season, Acton left at the conclusion of his contract to sign a three-year deal with fellow DEL club, the Thomas Sabo Ice Tigers, on April 26, 2018.

Personal
Acton was born in Edina, Minnesota, but grew up in Whitchurch–Stouffville, Ontario. His father, Keith, was playing for the Minnesota North Stars at his time of birth.

His father also played hockey professionally with the Montreal Canadiens, Edmonton Oilers, Philadelphia Flyers, Washington Capitals and New York Islanders over a 17-year playing career, winning a Stanley Cup in 1988 as a member of the Oilers. Keith previously held the role of Associate Coach to Dallas Eakins, the former Oilers head coach and former head coach of the Toronto Marlies.

Career statistics

References

External links

1987 births
American men's ice hockey centers
Canadian ice hockey centres
Edmonton Oilers players
Ice hockey players from Minnesota
Lake Superior State Lakers men's ice hockey players
Living people
Oklahoma City Barons players
People from Edina, Minnesota
Reading Royals players
Schwenninger Wild Wings players
Thomas Sabo Ice Tigers players
Toronto Marlies players
Undrafted National Hockey League players
Utica Comets players
Canadian expatriate ice hockey players in Germany